The Cortland Review is an online literary magazine established in 1997, publishing in 6 annual issues the work of prominent poets and writers in text, audio, and video.

See also 
 List of literary magazines

External links
 

Bimonthly magazines published in the United States
Magazines established in 1997
Magazines published in New York City
Online literary magazines published in the United States